The First Statute of Repeal was an Act of the Parliament of England (1 Mary, st. 2, c. 2), passed in 1553 in the first Parliament of Mary I's reign, nullified all religious legislation passed under the previous monarch, the boy-king Edward VI, and the de facto rulers of that time, Edward Seymour, 1st Duke of Somerset, and John Dudley, 1st Duke of Northumberland.

Elizabeth I's Act of Uniformity nullified this act, stating that:

The statute was repealed by Section 8 of the 1603 Act of Parliament 1 Jac.1 c.25.

See also
 Revival of the Heresy Acts
 Second Statute of Repeal

References

1553 in law
1553 in England
Acts of the Parliament of England (1485–1603)